Risto Matti Soramies (born 13 December 1946 in Helsinki, Finland) is the first bishop of the Evangelical Lutheran Mission Diocese of Finland since 4 May 2013. He was ordained by Matti Väisänen, a bishop of the Mission Province of Sweden and Finland.

In December 2014 Soramies consecrated Robert Kaumba as bishop of the Lutheran Evangelical Church in Africa—Zambia Diocese.

References

1946 births
Finnish bishops
Living people
Clergy from Helsinki